OPV Nemesis is an offshore patrol vessel of the New South Wales Police Force. It was acquired in 2008 to replace two older 22-metre vessels. It is designed to support a range of police operations up to  out to sea, including detecting illegal immigration, smuggling and drug trafficking and supporting counter terrorism and search and rescue.

The design specifications for the ship were drawn in 2005, taking into account lessons from the Pong Su incident. Nemesis was built by Tenix Defence in Henderson, Western Australia based on the   ships built by Tenix for the Philippine Coast Guard. At the time of its construction, Nemesis was the largest purpose-built police boat in the Southern Hemisphere.

As well as policing duties it is able to assist operations of the Australian Fisheries Management Authority and the Australian Customs and Border Protection Service.

Standard police issue firearms are carried on board and the vessel itself has provision for fitting mounted weapons in the future.

Nemesis was part of the support patrol for the 2009 Sydney to Hobart Yacht Race.

In 2010, the NSW Police was criticised for only operating the ship for 403 hours in 2009. Deployments were subsequently increased to 80 hours per month.

References

External links

2008 ships
New South Wales Police Force
Patrol vessels of Australia
Ships built in Western Australia